Clifton Gilliard (March 17, 1938 – June 20, 2017) was an American football player, coach, and college athletics administrator. He has served the head football coach, head men's track and field and cross country coach, and interim athletic director at Prairie View A&M University.
Clifton Gilliard  was inducted into the Prairie View A&M University Hall of Fame in 1994 and Texas Black Sports Hall of Fame in 2013.[1]

Playing career
Gilliard played football at Prairie View as a halfback.  He was a three-year letterman and played for Prairie View's 1958 national championship team under Billy Nicks, and was named all-conference that same year.

Coaching career

Football
Gilliard was the 20th head football coach at Prairie View A&M University in Prairie View, Texas, a position he held during the 1999 season.  His record at Prairie View was 2–8. He coached his only son Reginald "Bo" Gilliard at Prairie View A&M who was pick up by the New England Patriots in 1993. Bo Gilliard played 6 years of professional football.

Track and field, cross country
Gilliard was a track and field coach at Prairie View.  In 2007 and 2008, he was named Men's Indoor and Outdoor Track and Field Coach of the Year.
2006 Cross Country Coach of the YearSouthwestern Athletic Conference.

Head coaching record

Football

References

External links
 

1938 births
2017 deaths
American football halfbacks
Prairie View A&M Panthers and Lady Panthers athletic directors
Prairie View A&M Panthers football coaches
Prairie View A&M Panthers football players
Prairie View A&M Panthers and Lady Panthers track and field coaches
Prairie View A&M Panthers and Lady Panthers cross country coaches
African-American coaches of American football
African-American college athletic directors in the United States
African-American players of American football
20th-century African-American sportspeople
21st-century African-American sportspeople